The 1987 Asian Club Championship was the 7th edition of the annual Asian club football competition hosted by Asian Football Confederation. Several Asian clubs started the qualifying round in Fall of 1987.

Yomiuri FC (Japan) became the second Japanese club to win the Asian Championship.

Qualifying round

Group 1

All matches were played in Kuwait.

Group 2

All matches were played in Dhaka, Bangladesh.

Group 3

All matches were played in Malé, Maldives.

Group 4

All matches were played in Bandung, Indonesia.

Group 5

All matches were played in Dalian, China PR.

Group 6

All matches were played home & away.

Group stage

Group A

All matches were played in Riyadh, Saudi Arabia.

Group B

All matches were played in Kuala Lumpur, Malaysia.

Final

The final was scratched and Yomiuri FC were awarded the championship as Al-Hilal were unable to field a team due to nine of their starting players being chosen for the Saudi national team's preparation camp that clashed with the date fixed for the first leg.

References
Asian Club Competitions 1988 at RSSSF

1987 in Asian football
1987